Wear Mill (also known as Weir Mill) was an integrated cotton works on the Cheadle Heath bank of the River Mersey in Stockport, Greater Manchester, in England. It was started around 1790 and added to, particularly in 1831 and 1884. In 1840, the Stockport Viaduct was built over the river and over Wear Mill.

Location
The original water-powered Wear Mill was built on the southern bank of the River Mersey,  from its source at the confluence on the River Tame and the River Goyt.

History
The first record of a mill on this site was when John Collier, a cotton manufacturer built a mill on this site in 1790. It was water powered. The mill probably consisted of two multi-storey spinning mills and attached weaving sheds, one destroyed by fire in 1831 and the other rebuilt in 1884. Thomas Fernley bought the mill in 1824, and in 1831 needed to replace one mill with a new one that was of fireproof construction. This mill was eleven bays long and six storeys high. The floors were sprung on transverse brick arches supported on cast iron columns. It was driven by a beam engine in an internal engine house to the east of the mill. It was over this engine house that the Manchester and Birmingham Railway built the Stockport Viaduct in 1840, and again when it widened in 1880. The second mill was replaced in 1884, but not the original wheelhouse. It is a five-storey, 15-bay mill of fireproof construction with narrow longitudinal vaults springing from iron joints. The original weaving sheds have been replaced with two-storey structures, creating a complex site.

Owners
John Collier
Thomas Fernley
Fine Cotton Spinners & Doublers Ltd

See also

List of mills in Stockport
Listed buildings in Stockport
Textile manufacturing

References

Bibliography

External links
 Cottontown.org website
 Spinningtheweb.org website

Textile mills in the Metropolitan Borough of Stockport
Grade II listed buildings in the Metropolitan Borough of Stockport
Cotton mills
Former textile mills in the United Kingdom